Bryan Leonard Camberlain was a former American football offensive tackle. He attended Monroe Comprehensive High School in Atlanta, Georgia. Camberlain graduated from Georgia Institute of Technology in 2016.

High school career
Chamberlain was born August 15, 1993 in Albany, Georgia to parents Tanya and Fredrick Chamberlain. He attended Monroe Comprehensive High School and started his high school sports career as a freshman playing center on the basketball team. The offensive line coach on the football team promised Chamberlain's mother that he would get Chamberlain a college scholarship if she allowed her son to play football. Chamberlain started on the football team the following three years and did not return to the basketball court. He was named an all-region and all-metro player and played in the Georgia-Florida high school All-Star game. A mid-level three-star recruit (Rivals.com rated him the #87 prospect and 247Sports.com rated him #64 prospect in the state of Georgia), Chamberlain garnered interest from such colleges as Georgia, Clemson, and Louisville but committed to Georgia Tech in April 2010. He graduated from Monroe in May 2011.

College career
Chamberlain redshirted his true freshman year at Georgia Tech in 2011. In 2012, he played in all 14 games for the Yellow Jackets, including a start against Presbyterian in a 59-3 victory on September 8. Chamberlain started the first seven games of 2013 at right tackle but lost his starting job after the October 19th game against Syracuse. He remained the top back up for the second half of the season and helped the Georgia Tech offensive line to average only one sack per game and the offense to rank sixth nationally in rushing. The 2014 season saw Chamberlain regain his starting job on the offensive line, missing only one start (vs Duke on October 11) due to injury. He was a part of a Yellow Jackets offensive line that ranked first in the ACC and second nationally in sacks allowed. Chamberlain also helped the Georgia Tech offense gained a school record 4,789 yards rushing and average 342.1 rushing yards per game. He earned Honorable Mention on the ACSMA 2014 All-ACC team. In 2015, Chamberlain started nine of twelve games at left tackle, helped the offense rank first in the ACC in rushing for the ninth year in a row, and, again, earned All-ACC Honorable Mention honors. He finished his career at Georgia Tech with 30 career starts and playing in 51 total games.

Professional career

Pre-draft

Atlanta Falcons
On May 5, 2016, Chamberlain was invited to tryout for the Atlanta Falcons of the National Football League (NFL) with the team's 2016 draftees and 22 recently signed college free agents (CFAs) during a two-day rookie mini-camp in Flowery Branch, Georgia.

San Diego Chargers
After not being sign by the Falcons, Chamberlain was invited to tryout for the NFL's San Diego Chargers during the team's rookie mini-camp on May 13, 2016.

References

External links
 Georgia Tech Yellow Jackets bio

1993 births
Living people
American football offensive tackles
Sportspeople from Albany, Georgia
Georgia Tech Yellow Jackets football players